Rebecca Dwyer (née Reuter; born 11 July 1986) is an Australian field hockey player.

Personal life
Dwyer was born and raised in Toowoomba, Queensland.

She is a teacher at St Laurence's College in South Brisbane.

Career

State level
In domestic competitions, Dwyer plays hockey for her home state, Queensland.

Hockeyroos
Dwyer made her senior international debut for the Hockeyroos in 2013, in a test match against Argentina in Perth, Western Australia.

In 2014, Dwyer appeared for the national team again, during a test series in New Zealand and at the Champions Trophy in Argentina, where she won a silver medal.

References

External links
 
 

1986 births
Living people
Australian female field hockey players
Female field hockey midfielders
21st-century Australian women